Duncan McIvor (11 November 1884 – 18 November 1930) was an Australian rules footballer who played for Collingwood in the Victorian Football League (VFL).

McIvor played in 29 games during four seasons over six years for Collingwood in the VFL. He was a back flank for Collingwood in the 1910 Grand Final win over Carlton.

McIvor played in Collingwood's loss to Essendon in the 1911 Grand Final. This was his last game for over two years until he returned to play one more game in round 10, 1914, a win over Carlton.

McIvor is the great-grandfather of North Queensland Cowboys rugby league footballer Michael Morgan.

References

External links

 
 

1884 births
1930 deaths
Australian rules footballers from Victoria (Australia)
Australian Rules footballers: place kick exponents
Collingwood Football Club players
Collingwood Football Club Premiership players
One-time VFL/AFL Premiership players